The 1967–68 Divizia B was the 28th season of the second tier of the Romanian football league system.

The format has been maintained to two series, each of them having 14 teams. At the end of the season the winners of the series promoted to Divizia A. Due to expansion of Divizia A and Divizia B from 14 to 16 teams, also the second places from the series played a promotion play-off, at the end of which the second place from the second series also promoted to Divizia A and last two places from both series played a relegation play-off against second places from Divizia C, at the end of which only one team relegated.

Team changes

To Divizia B
Promoted from Divizia C
 Victoria Roman
 Portul Constanța
 Metalul Hunedoara
 Olimpia Oradea

Relegated from Divizia A
 CSMS Iași
 Politehnica Timișoara

From Divizia B
Relegated to Divizia C
 Progresul Brăila
 Minerul Lupeni
 Oțelul Galați
 Unirea Dej

Promoted to Divizia A
 Dinamo Bacău
 ASA Mureșul Târgu Mureș

Renamed teams 
CSMS Iași was renamed as Politehnica Iași.

Dinamo Victoria București was renamed as Electronica Obor București.

Metalurgistul București was renamed as Metalul București.

Oltul Râmnicu Vâlcea was renamed as Chimia Râmnicu Vâlcea.

Other teams 
Siderurgistul Galați gave away its place in the Divizia B to Politehnica Galați, former Știința Galați. Siderurgistul was then dissolved.

Clujeana Cluj merged with CFR Cluj (which appeared again in a lower division), the first one being absorbed by the second one.

League tables

Serie I

Serie II

Divizia A play-off
The 13th and 14th-placed teams of the Divizia A faces the 2nd-placed teams from the series of the Divizia B. The play-off tournament was played in Timișoara.

Round 1

|}

Round 2

|}

Round 3

|}

Divizia B play-off
The 13th and 14th-placed teams of the Divizia B faces the 2nd-placed teams from the series of the Divizia C. The play-off tournaments were played in Brașov and Arad.

Group I (Brașov)

Group II (Arad)

See also 

 1967–68 Divizia A

References

Liga II seasons
Romania
2